Forty Thousand Horsemen (aka 40,000 Horsemen) is a 1940 Australian war film directed by Charles Chauvel. The film tells the story of the Australian Light Horse (mounted rifleman as distinct from cavalry) which operated in the desert at the Sinai and Palestine campaign during World War I. It follows the adventures of three rowdy heroes in fighting and romance. The film culminates at the Battle of Beersheba which is reputedly "the last successful cavalry charge in history". The film was clearly a propaganda weapon, to aid in recruitment and lift the pride of Australians at home during World War II. It was one of the most successful Australian movies of its day. It was later remade in 1987 as The Lighthorsemen.

From the Prologue to the movie

When Germany stretched greedy hands towards the Middle East in the war or 1914–1918, a great cavalry force came into being.

They were the men from Australia and New Zealand – The ANZACS – the "Mad Bushmen" – the men from "Downunder". Call them what you will – their glories can never grow dim.

They met the Germanised Army in the burning desert of Sinai.

They fought and suffered to emerge triumphant – the greatest cavalry force of modern times.

To these dauntless riders and their gallant horses this story is dedicated. To them with pride, their own sons are saying today -

"The torch you threw to us, we caught and now our hands will hold it high. Its glorious light will never die!"

Plot
In 1916 Jerusalem, German troops led by Captain Von Schiller arrest French wine seller Paul Rouget for spying and hang him. His daughter Juliet goes into hiding dressed as a boy and starts spying on the Germans.

Three members of the Australian Lighthorse, Red, Larry and Jim, are enjoying themselves (including a game of two-up) on leave in Cairo, when called to fight the Turks. They take part in several battles including the march to Ogratina and the Battle of Romani. Red is separated from the others after one battle and has his life saved by Juliet, who he thinks is an Arab boy.

Red is reunited with his friends and they arrive at an Arab village. He meets Juliet and realises she was the boy who saved his life. They begin a romance.

The Battle of Gaza takes place; Jim and Larry are mortally wounded and Red is captured. He is sent to Beersheba to work as slave labour and discovers the town is wired with explosives. Juliet rescues him and they spend the night together in a hut. Jim manages to rejoin his unit in time to participate in the charge of the Light Horse at the Battle of Beersheba, and stops Von Schiller before he detonates the explosives. The Germans and Turks are defeated and a wounded Red is reunited with Juliet.

Cast

Grant Taylor as Red Gallagher
Betty Bryant as Juliette Rouget
Pat Twohill as Larry
Chips Rafferty as Jim
Eric Reiman as Von Schiller
Joe Valli as Scotty
Kenneth Brampton as German officer
Albert C. Winn as Sheik Abu
Harvey Adams as Von Hausen
Norman Maxwell as Ismet
Harry Abdy as Paul Rouget
Pat Penny as Captain Seidi
Charles Zoli as cafe owner
Claude Turton as Othman
Theo Lianos as Abdul
Roy Mannix as Light Horse sergeant
Edna Emmett
Vera Kandy
Iris Kennedy
joy Heart
Michael Pate as Arab
 Harold (Roy) Phillips as Arab

Production

Development
Chauvel was the nephew of Sir Harry Chauvel, commander of the Australian Light Horse during the Sinai and Palestine campaign and had long planned a film based on the exploits of the Light Horse. It was originally to be titled Thunder Over the Desert.

To raise funds for a movie, Chauvel shot a £5,000 "teaser" sequence, consisting of a cavalry charge based around the Battle of Beersheba. The cost for this was paid for by Herc McIntyre, managing director of Universal Pictures in Australia who was a long-time friend and associate of Chauvel's. Filming of this sequence took place on 1 February 1938 on the Cronulla sand dunes using a cavalry division of the Australian Light Horse, which had been performing in the New South Wales sesquicentenary celebrations.

The charge was filmed by a four-camera unit, composed of Frank Hurley, Tasman Higgins, Bert Nicholas and John Heyer. A cavalryman was injured during the shoot.

In 1939 Chauvel and McIntyre formed Famous Films Ltd to make the movie. Chauvel used the footage to raise the budget, which was originally announced at £25,000. £5,000 was provided by McIntyre and £10,000 from Hoyts. The New South Wales government agreed to guarantee a bank overdraft of £15,000 although they did not invest directly in the movie.

Casting
The movie marked the first lead role for Grant Taylor, who rose to prominence in Dad Rudd, MP (1940). It was the first sizeable role for Chips Rafferty, who had been cast after a screen test. Chauvel described him as "a cross between Slim Summerville and Jame Stewart, and has a variety of droll yet natural humour." Joe Valli reprised his Scottish soldier from Pat Hanna's Digger Shows.

Taylor was paid £15 a week, Rafferty £10 a week.

Betty Bryant was a discovery of Elsa Chauvel's. She beat out Pat Firman for the role.

Shooting
Shooting began in May 1940. Interiors were shot in the Cinesound studios at Bondi which Chauvel leased from Cinesound Productions for a three-month period. A second unit was used to build a desert village at Cronulla. The battle scenes were shot there in July and August, using the 1st Light Horse (Machine Gun) Regiment and the 30th Battalion.

Censorship
After the film's preview, the Commonwealth film censor, Creswell O'Reilly, requested three major cuts – display of the dancing girls in a cabaret, the love scene between Red and Juliette in a hut, and alleged cruelty to horses during the final charge. This threatened Chauvel's ability to export the film and screen it in Victoria. Eventually the Minister for Customs, Eric Harrison, overruled the decision and allowed the movie to be screened uncut. The movie was also passed uncut in Victoria.

Release

Critical
Reviews were overwhelmingly positive. The critic from The Sydney Morning Herald claimed that "there have been some good Australian films before this one, but Forty Thousand Horsemen has every right to be regarded as the first really great Australian picture."

Filmink magazine later wrote "the film was Taylor's. There had been other notable leading men in Australian films – Snowy Baker, Errol Flynn – but it was really Taylor who was the first tough Aussie star type, that would be so exemplified by Rod Taylor, Jack Thompson, Mel Gibson and Bryan Brown."

Box office
It was a massive success at the box office, grossing £10,000 within its first three weeks of release, enabling Famous Features Ltd to buy out the interest of the New South Wales government for £15,000. The film was seen by 287,000 in Sydney alone during a ten-week run on first release.

Female lead Betty Bryant was sent to Singapore for the film's premiere in June 1941. While there she met MGM executive Maurice Silverstein, who she would later marry, leading to her retirement from acting.

Foreign release
The movie was released in the US by Sherman S. Krellberg for Monogram Pictures and was very well received.

"Yippee for brawling, boisterous entertainment", wrote the critic for The New York Times, praising Betty Bryant ("whatever it is that leaps across the celluloid barrier, she has") although claiming the story was "foolish".<ref>{{Cite news|title=' Forty Thousand Horsemen,' Otherwise the Anzacs of World War I, Charges into the Globe Theatre|author=T.S.. The|date=15 August 1941|work=The New York Times|page=13}}</ref> The Los Angeles Times said the film was "conventional in formula but enlivened by stirring battle scenes – and new faces." "Contains all the color and lusty vigor of the men themselves" said The Washington Post.

It earned over £40,000 in the UK.

In 1954 the film was cut down to 50 minutes for screening on US television.

References
Citations

Sources

External links

Complete copyright material including full script at National Archives of Australia
 Review of film at The New York TimesForty Thousand Horsemen at National Film and Sound Archive
Forty Thousand Horsemen at Australian Screen Online
Forty Thousand Horsemen at Oz Movies
Brian Trenchard-Smith on 40,000 Horsemen at Trailers from Hell
Review of film at VarietyReview of film at Variety''

Australian Light Horse
1940 films
1940s English-language films
World War I films set in the Middle East
Australian World War II propaganda films
Films set in the Ottoman Empire
1940 war films
Australian World War I films
Australian black-and-white films
1940s Australian films